Satan is a 1991 Soviet thriller film directed by Viktor Aristov. It was entered into the 41st Berlin International Film Festival where it won the Silver Bear - Special Jury Prize.

Initially the film was planned to be based on the novel Nonhuman (Нелюдь) by Arkadi Vayner, but the director failed to reach an agreement with Vayners, and he wrote a new screenplay loosely based on the central idea of Vayners' novel, an abduction of the daughter of a VIP woman. Vayner sued, unsuccessfully.

Cast
 Maria Averbach
 Svetlana Bragarnik
 Sergei Kupriyanov

References

External links

1991 films
1991 crime drama films
1990s Russian-language films
Films directed by Viktor Aristov
Vayner Brothers
Soviet crime drama films
Russian crime drama films
Silver Bear Grand Jury Prize winners